Rev3Games was a streaming television channel owned by Revision3, a subsidiary of Discovery Digital Networks, with shows about video games. The channel launched on March 13, 2012. On November 12, 2012, Revision3 announced that it had hired Adam Sessler, a previous staff member of TechTV who had continued through to G4 to host the television series X-Play.  Sessler was the editor-in-chief and executive producer of Rev3Games, until leaving Discovery Digital Networks in April 2014. The channel includes reviews and previews of upcoming games, interviews, and general discussion of video games. The channel's final hosts were Tara Long and Nick Robinson. Past hosts were Max Scoville, Scott Bromley, and Anthony Carboni. Discovery Digital Networks ended the operations of Rev3Games on November 6, 2014, for reasons that have not been disclosed.

Programming

Address the Sess
Sessler engages in conversation with fans live on Google+ Hangouts. The show has ceased production since Adam Sessler's departure from Discovery Digital Networks.

Casual Friday
Rev3Games staff discuss a gaming related topic.

Coffee Talk
Nick Robinson talks with people from the office about gaming related topics.

Max Scoville's Study Hall
Max Scoville recommends products within different forms of pop culture, in relation to an upcoming game. This show is no longer produced, as Scoville has since left Rev3Games.

Rev3Games Originals
Sessler interviews video game developers.  The future of the show is unknown since Adam Sessler's departure from Discovery Digital Networks.

Rev3Games Previews
Rev3Games' hosts give their impressions on upcoming games.

Rev3Games Reviews
Rev3Games' host give their opinions on recently released games and give a score on a scale of 1 to 5. Sessler structured the reviews similarly to X-play's reviews because that is what he was familiar with and he dislikes the 10 point scale.

Sessler's ...Something
Sessler shares his thoughts on games and the gaming industry.  The show has ceased production since Adam Sessler's departure from Discovery Digital Networks.

Spoiled Games
Sessler and 2 guests discuss everything about a specific game. The future of the show is unknown since both Adam Sessler's and Anthony Carboni's departure from Discovery Digital Networks.

Game of the Year
2012: Journey 
2013: BioShock Infinite & The Last of Us

References

External links
  (Wayback Machine copy)

Streaming television
Internet properties established in 2012
Internet properties disestablished in 2014